Charles Hyde Warren (September 27, 1876 – August 16, 1950) was an American geologist. He grew up in Watertown, Connecticut. He graduated from the Sheffield Scientific School in 1896. He was on the faculty of the Massachusetts Institute of Technology from 1900 to 1922. He was Sterling Professor and chair of Geology at Yale University and Dean of the Sheffield Scientific School starting in 1922. He was also professor of Mineralogy. In 1908, he was elected a Fellow of the American Academy of Arts and Sciences. Warren retired in 1945. He was a member of the Geological Society of America.

References 

1876 births
1950 deaths
American geologists
Fellows of the American Academy of Arts and Sciences
Massachusetts Institute of Technology faculty
People from Watertown, Connecticut
Yale School of Engineering & Applied Science alumni
Sheffield Scientific School faculty
Yale Sterling Professors